Tellurols are analogues of alcohols and phenols where tellurium replaces oxygen. Tellurols, selenols, and thiols have similar properties, but tellurols are the least stable. Although they are fundamental representatives of organotellurium compounds, tellurols are lightly studied because of their instability. Tellurol derivatives include telluroesters (RC(O)TeR') and tellurocyanates (RTeCN).

Properties
Alkyltellurols are colorless liquids with strong odors.  Samples usually appear yellowish owing to the presence of dialkylditelluride impurities. Near room temperature, methanetellurol degrades with loss of elemental tellurium.  It is reported to ignite in air. 

Aryltellurols are more robust and have been obtained as colorless crystals. Some of the most stable tellurols are the bulky silylated derivatives of tris(trimethylsilyl)methane and analogues.

Acid–base properties
 
The absence of hydrogen-bonding explains the low boiling temperature of tellurols.

Preparation
The first tellurol to be synthesized, ethanetellurol, was prepared in 1926 via the Grignard reagent. The most frequently used method involves reduction of the ditellurides.

References

Organotellurium compounds
Hydrides
Functional groups